The Utah Gender-Neutral Constitutional Language Amendment, appearing on the ballot as Utah Constitutional Amendment A, is a constitutional amendment in Utah, which appeared on the ballot on November 3, 2020. The amendment intended to replace all gendered language in the Constitution of Utah with gender-neutral language. According to Deidre Henderson, the State Senator who proposed the amendment, only 6 of the 237 sections of the constitution would be modified, in order to bring them in line with the other 231 sections, which already use gender-neutral language. The amendment was unanimously approved in both the State Senate and the Utah House of Representatives, allowing it to be put on the ballot. If the amendment was passed by voters, it would go into effect in 2021.

Preliminary results

References 

Gender-Neutral Constitutional Language Amendment